The Robin DR.200 is a family of French conventional landing gear single-engined light touring or training cabin monoplanes. Originally produced by Centre Est Aéronautique the company later changed its name to Avions Pierre Robin.

Development
Originally flown as the DR.200 which was a variant of the earlier DR.1050M1 with a strengthened wing and longer fuselage. The production version was the DR.250 Capitaine a four-seater with a 160 hp Lycoming O-320 engine and all-flying tailplane. The DR.250 first flew in 1965. The next development was a two-seat variant with a shorter fuselage the DR.220 2+2, it was powered by a 105 hp Continental O-200-A engine. The DR.221 Dauphin introduced a bigger 115 hp Lycoming O-235C engine. Then the DR.253 Regent was first flown in 1967, introducing a tricycle landing gear which was to become standard on all the following Robin designs.

Variants

DR.200
Prototype four-seat development of the DR.1050M1 with a Potez 105E engine, two built.
DR.220 2+2
Shorter fuselage two-seat variant although it did have a small rear seat, powered by a 105hp Continental O-200-A engine, 83 built.
DR.221 Dauphin
A DR.200 with four seats and powered by a 115hp Lycoming O-235C engine, 62 built.
DR.250 Capitaine
A DR.200 with all-flying tailplane and powered by a 160hp Lycoming O-320-E engine, 100 built.
DR.250-180
Experimental DR.250 with a 180hp Lycoming O-360-A engine, one built.
DR.253 Regent
A DR.250 with enlarged fuselage and tricycle landing gear, powered by a Lycoming O-360-D2A engine, 100 built.

Specifications (DR.221)

See also

References

Notes

Bibliography

1960s French civil utility aircraft
DR200
Single-engined tractor aircraft
Aircraft first flown in 1964